Henry Howard may refer to:

Nobles and politicians

U.K.
Henry Howard, Earl of Surrey (1517–1547), English aristocrat and poet
Henry Howard, 1st Earl of Northampton (1540–1614), son of the Earl of Surrey
Henry Howard, 22nd Earl of Arundel (1608–1652)
Henry Howard, 5th Earl of Suffolk (1627–1709)
Henry Howard, 6th Duke of Norfolk (1628–1684)
Henry Howard, 7th Duke of Norfolk (1655–1701), politician and soldier
Henry Howard, 6th Earl of Suffolk (1670–1718), English nobleman
Henry Howard, 4th Earl of Carlisle (1694–1758), Whig MP for Morpeth 1715–38
Henry Howard, 11th Earl of Suffolk (1686–1757), English peer
Henry Howard, 10th Earl of Suffolk (1706–1745), MP for Bere Alston 1728–33
Henry Howard, 12th Earl of Suffolk (1739–1779), British politician
Henry Howard, 13th Earl of Suffolk (1779–1779), British peer
Henry Howard, 13th Duke of Norfolk (1791–1856), Whig MP for Horsham 1829–32
Henry Howard, 2nd Earl of Effingham (1806–1889), British peer and Member of Parliament
Henry Howard, 18th Earl of Suffolk (1833–1898), British peer and Liberal Party politician
Henry Howard, 3rd Earl of Effingham (1837–1898), English peer
Henry Howard, 4th Earl of Effingham (1866–1927), English peer and member of the House of Lords
Henry Howard, 19th Earl of Suffolk (1877–1917), British peer
Henry Howard (1802–1875), British MP for Steyning 1824–26, New Shoreham 1826–32
Henry Howard (MP for Penrith) (1850–1914), British MP
Henry Thomas Howard (1808–1851), British soldier and politician
Henry Francis Howard (1809–1898), British diplomat, minister to several countries
Henry Howard (diplomat) (1843–1921), first formal British envoy to the Vatican for over 300 years

U.S.
 Henry Howard (Rhode Island politician) (1826–1905), Republican Governor of Rhode Island
 Henry Howard (Detroit) (1801–1878), businessman and mayor of Detroit
 Henry Howard (Michigan politician) (1833–1894), businessman and mayor of Port Huron
 Henry Howard (Georgia politician) (1955-2022), member of Georgia House of Representatives

Other
Henry Howard (1684–1720), English Catholic priest, created titular bishop of Utica and coadjutor with Bonaventure Giffard
Henry Howard (historian) (1757–1842), English antiquarian and family historian
Henry Howard (artist) (1769–1847), painter
Henry Howard (priest) (1795–1868), dean of Lichfield
Henry Howard (architect) (1818–1884), designer of landmarks in New Orleans and Louisiana 
Henry Howard (Australia) (1859–1933), Methodist preacher
Henry Newman Howard (1861–1929), English poet and dramatist
T. Henry Howard (1849–1923), Chief of the Staff of the Salvation Army
Henry Eliot Howard (1873–1940), amateur English ornithologist
Henry Howard (British Army officer) (1915–2000)

See also
 Harry Howard (disambiguation)
 Henry Fitzalan-Howard (disambiguation)